Archdiocese of Halyč may refer to the following Catholic ecclesiastical jurisdictions in Slavic Galicia with archiepiscopal (co-)see at Halych, western Ukraine :

 the old Latin Roman Catholic Archdiocese of Halyč 
 the Eastern Catholic (Byzantine rite) Major Archeparchy of Kiev–Galicia (Kyiv-Halych)